Short Trips may refer to:

 BBC Short Trips, a series of three Doctor Who short story collections published by the BBC, or the first book in that series.
 Big Finish Short Trips, a series of 29 Doctor Who short story collections published by Big Finish Productions.
Short Trips: Indefinable Magic, 2009 book